Ishq Jalebi is a 2021 Pakistani romantic comedy television series, directed by Syed Wajahat Hussain and written by Saima Akram Chaudhry for 7th Sky Entertainment produced by Abdullah Kadwani and Asad Qureshi. It premiered on 14 April 2021 on Geo Entertainment and aired during Ramadan and Eid al-Fitr. 
It features Wahaj Ali and Madiha Imam as leads. Noor ul Hassan, Qavi Khan, Mehmood Aslam and many others were also part of the cast. The drama emerged as a huge critical success and was highly appreciated by the audience.

Plot 
Muhammad Boota owns a decades old family business of catering. His wish to make both of his sons, Rafaqat and Sadaqat a part of his business, remains unfulfilled as his sons along with their families settle abroad. Disheartened by his sons, Muhammad Boota gives away his family business in the care of his only son in law, Ashiq Hussain and grandson, Basim.

Basim, a handsome young man dreams of moving abroad but is quite frustrated and complains about every inconvenience in his life. On the other hand, Bela is a beautiful young girl who has been living with her grandfather after the death of her parents. Being a sensible and hardworking girl, Bela disregards the attitude of her cousin, Basim and the two of them are always arguing with each other.

The story takes a turn when everyone finds out about the split in ownership of the family business leading Rafaqat and Sadaqat just to visit Pakistan with their families but they get trapped due to the COVID-19 pandemic in Pakistan.

What begins as an unusual family reunion slowly escalates into a series of realizations, family bonding and a chance of young love. Amongst this family dramedy, will Basim and Bela realize their true love for each other.

Cast and characters

Soundtrack 

The original soundtrack of Ishq Jalebi "Piya Piya Re" was written and sung by Wajhi Farooki. The lines of the song are frequently used during the course of the show. The original soundtrack was released on 14 April 2021. The song along with production is produced by Abdul Kadwani and Asad Qureshi.

Awards and nominations

Lux Style Awards

Fuchsia Magazine Awards

References

External links 
 Ishq Jalebi on Har Pal Geo 
 Ishq Jalebi on 7th Sky Entertainment

Urdu-language television shows
Geo TV original programming
Pakistani drama television series
2021 Pakistani television series debuts
Television shows about the COVID-19 pandemic